The discography of New Zealand recording artist Bic Runga consists of six studio albums. In 2016, Runga was inducted in the New Zealand Music Hall of Fame.

Albums

Studio albums

Compilation albums

Live albums

Extended plays

Singles

As lead artist

As featured artist

Guest appearances

Notes

References

Discographies of New Zealand artists
Pop music discographies
Rhythm and blues discographies